The Democratic Party of Virginia (DPVA/VA Dems) is the Virginia affiliate of the Democratic Party based in Richmond, Virginia.

Historically, the Democratic Party has dominated Virginia politics. Since the 1851 Virginia gubernatorial election, the first gubernatorial election in Virginia in which the governor was elected by direct popular vote, 34 Virginia Governors have been Democrats. Since the 1851 Virginia lieutenant gubernatorial election, the first lieutenant gubernatorial election in Virginia in which the lieutenant governor was elected by direct popular vote, 29 Virginia Lieutenant Governors have been Democrats. Since the 1851 Virginia Attorney General election, the first Attorney General election in Virginia in which the Attorney General was elected by direct popular vote, 25 Attorneys General have been Democrats.

As of 2022, Democrats hold a majority in the Senate chamber of the state legislature, controlling 22 of 40 Virginia Senate seats. At the federal level, Virginia has voted for every Democratic presidential candidate since 2008. Democrats hold six of the Commonwealth's 11 U.S. House seats and both of the Commonwealth's U.S. Senate seats.

Organization

Staff
 Executive Director: Shyam Raman
 Communications Director: Liam Watson
 Deputy Executive Director and Chief Technology Officer: Brenner Tobe
 Data Director: Katie O'Grady
 Digital Director: Nick Scott
 Finance Director: Randy Sprinkle
 Chief Operations Officer: Kristi Glass
 Political Director: Jack Foley
 Local Candidates Coordinator: Tierra Ward
 Voter Protection Director: Ja'Scotta Jefferson

Steering Committee
The Steering Committee makes decisions about the Party in-between meetings of the Central Committee, and also has an exclusive role of overseeing staff.

 Chairwoman: Susan Swecker
 1st Vice Chair for Organization: Gaylene Kanoyton
 2nd Vice Chair for Rules and Resolutions: Marc Broklawsk
 Vice Chair for Technology and Communications: Ricardo Alfaro
 Vice Chair for Outreach: Sen. L. Louise Lucas
 Vice Chair for Finance: Clarence Tong
 Secretary: Isaac Sarver
 Treasurer: Abbi Easter
 DNC Member: Del. Joshua Cole
 DNC Member: Doris Crouse-Mays
 DNC Member: Elizabeth Guzman
 DNC Member: Dave Leichtman
 DNC Member: Atima Omara
 DNC Member: Mayor Levar Stoney
 1st Congressional District Democratic Committee Chair: Dianne Carter de Mayo
 2nd Congressional District Democratic Committee Chair: Sandra Brandt
 3rd Congressional District Democratic Committee Chair: Charles Stanton
 4th Congressional District Democratic Committee Chair: Alexsis Rodgers
 5th Congressional District Democratic Committee Chair: Patricia Harper Tunley
 6th Congressional District Democratic Committee Chair: Kym Crump
 7th Congressional District Democratic Committee Chair: Matt Rowe
 8th Congressional District Democratic Committee Chair: Margo Horner
 9th Congressional District Democratic Committee Chair:  Mary Lynn Tate
 10th Congressional District Democratic Committee Chair: Zach Pruckowski
 11th Congressional District Democratic Committee Chair: Robert Haley
 Labor Caucus Chair: Julie Hunter
 Associations of Local Chairs Chair:  Tina Winkler
 Democratic Black Caucus Chair: EJ Scott
 Women's Caucus Chair: Linda Brooks
 LGBT Democrats of Virginia Chair: Maggie Sacra
 Veterans and Military Families Caucus Chair: Derek Kitts
 Virginia Young Democrats President: Denver Supinger
 DisAbility Caucus Chair: Cyliene Montgomery
 Democratic Asian Americans of Virginia Chair: Praveen Meyyan
 Democratic Latino Organization of Virginia President: Jonathan Dromgoole
 Rural Caucus Chair: Vee Frye
 Small Business Caucus Chair: Mark Cannady
 Immediate Past Chair: Dwight Jones

Central Committee
The Central Committee has full control over all matters of the Party, including the adoption of an annual budget, the method of nomination for statewide candidates such as Governor, Lieutenant Governor and Attorney General; the adoption of resolutions and policy statements. In addition, the Central Committee can veto any decision of the Steering Committee.

The Central Committee meets at least four times a year, usually in Richmond, although by tradition, the September meeting is in Fredericksburg. Central Committee meetings are accompanied by meetings of the Steering Committee the night before, and Caucus meetings over the weekend.

The Central Committee is composed of 20 members from each of Virginia's 11 congressional districts. Each district apportions the central committee seats to localities in the district based on population. Additionally, each district committee can elect three more members from local committees and one member of the Virginia General Assembly. The Central Committee is "reorganized" every four years following the election for Governor. The last reorganization was held in March of 2022.

In addition, the following people are ex-officio members of the Central Committee and their District Committees: 
 Members of the steering committee 
 Democratic Virginia members of the United States Congress 
 Democratic statewide elected officials, such as Governor, Lieutenant Governor, and Attorney General
 the President Pro Tempore of the Virginia Senate and the Speaker of the House of Delegates, provided they are Democrats 
 the Democratic Leaders of the Virginia House and Senate 
 the Chairs of the Democratic Caucuses in Virginia the House and Senate 
 the president, national committeeman, and national committeewoman of the Virginia Young Democrats 
 the president and first vice president of the Women's Caucus 
 the chair of the Association of Democratic Elected Officials 
 the chair of the Virginia Young Democrats Teen Caucus 
 the chair of the Virginia Young Democrats College Caucus 
 and the chair of the Virginia Young Democrats City/County Caucus

Local Democratic Committees
Local Democratic Committees serve to promote the Democratic Party in their specific locality. Some committees may contain several localities. Local committees may endorse candidates for nonpartisan office (such as school board) and assist in campaigning for their candidate.

Current elected officials

Members of Congress

U.S. Senate
Democrats have controlled both of Virginia's seats in the U.S. Senate since 2008:

U.S. House of Representatives
Out of the 11 seats Virginia is apportioned in the U.S. House of Representatives, five are held by Democrats:

Legislative leadership
 President pro tempore of the Senate of Virginia: Louise Lucas
 Senate Majority Leader: Dick Saslaw
 Senate Caucus Chair: Mamie Locke
 House Minority Leader: Don Scott
 House Caucus Chair: Charniele Herring

List of chairs
 John S. Barbour Jr. (1883–1889)
 Basil B. Gordon (1889–1890)
 J. Taylor Ellyson (1890–1916)
 Rorer A. James (1916–1921)
 Henry D. Flood (1921)
 Harry F. Byrd (1922–1924)
 J. Murray Hooker (1925–1940)
 Horace H. Edwards (1940–1948)
 G. Alvin Massenburg (1948–1952)
 William M. Tuck (July 1952–August 1952)
 T. Nelson Parker (August 1952–December 1952)
 Thomas H. Blanton (1952–1964)
 Watkins Abbitt Sr. (1964–1970)
 William G. Thomas (1970–1972)
 Joseph T. Fitzpatrick (1972–1979)
 Richard J. Davis (1979–1980)
 Owen B. Pickett (1980–1982)
 Alan Diamonstein (1982–1985)
 Richard J. Davis (1985–1986)
 Lawrence H. Framme III (1986–1990)
 Paul Goldman (1990–1993)
 Mark Warner (1993–1995)
 Suzie Wrenn (1995–1998)
 Kenneth R. Plum (1998–2000)
 Emily Couric (Co-chair, 2000–2001)
 Lawrence H. Framme III (Co-chair, 2000–2001; 2001–2003)
 Kerry J. Donley (2003–2005)
 Richard Cranwell (2005–2010)
 Brian Moran (2010–2012)
 Charniele Herring (2012–2014)
 Dwight C. Jones (2014–March 27, 2015)
 Susan Swecker (March 27, 2015–present)

Controversies

2019 Virginia political crisis
In 2019, all three of Virginia's statewide executive office holders, all Democrats, were embroiled in various controversies. Governor Ralph Northam's medical school yearbook page had featured an individual in blackface and an individual in a Ku Klux Klan hood, Lieutenant Governor Justin Fairfax was accused of having sexually assaulted a professor in 2004, and Attorney General Mark Herring was revealed to have worn blackface at a college party. Most Democrats urged Northam to resign from the governorship, but he refused. Ultimately, none of the three accused resigned.

Historical firsts

African Americans
 First African American Governor of Virginia and Lieutenant Governor of Virginia: Douglas Wilder
Arab Americans
 First Lebanese-American member of the Virginia House of Delegates: Hala Ayala
 First Palestinian-American member of the Virginia House of Delegates: Sam Rasoul
Asian Americans
 First Korean-American member of the Virginia House of Delegates: Mark Keam
 First Vietnamese-American member of the Virginia House of Delegates: Kathy Tran
 First Filipino-American member of the Virginia House of Delegates: Kelly Fowler
Jewish Americans
 First Jewish American to represent Virginia in the United States House of Representatives: Norman Sisisky
 First Jewish American Speaker of the Virginia House of Delegates: Eileen Filler-Corn
Latino Americans
 First Peruvian-American member of the Virginia House of Delegates: Elizabeth Guzmán
 First Salvadoran-American member of the Virginia House of Delegates: Hala Ayala
 First Mexican-American member of the Virginia House of Delegates: Kelly Fowler
LGBT
 First openly gay member of the Virginia House of Delegates and Senate of Virginia: Adam Paul Ebbin
 First openly lesbian member of the Virginia House of Delegates: Dawn M. Adams
 First openly transgender member of the Virginia House of Delegates: Danica Roem
Women
 First female Attorney General of Virginia: Mary Sue Terry
 First female Speaker of the Virginia House of Delegates: Eileen Filler-Corn

See also

 Politics of Virginia
 Republican Party of Virginia

References

External links
 Democratic Party of Virginia Party Website
 Virginia Young Democrats
 Arlington Democrats
 Senate Caucus
 House Caucus

 
Virginia
Political parties in Virginia
1924 establishments in Virginia